Disambiguation: pelves is also a plural alternative to pelvises.

Pelves is a commune in the Pas-de-Calais department in the Hauts-de-France region of France.

Geography

Population

Places of interest
 The church of St.Vaast, rebuilt along with the entire village, after World War I.
 The Commonwealth War Graves Commission cemetery.

See also
Communes of the Pas-de-Calais department

References

External links

 The CWGC graves in the local cemetery

Communes of Pas-de-Calais